Derek and Clive Get the Horn is a 1979 British documentary comedy film that chronicles the recording of Peter Cook and Dudley Moore's 1978 comedy album Derek and Clive Ad Nauseam, their third and final outing featuring their controversial alter-egos Derek and Clive, two foul-mouthed lavatory attendants who banter at length about their surreal day-to-day existences. The footage was shot in early September 1978. The film was the feature film directorial debut of Russell Mulcahy, who would go on to direct Highlander.

Cast
 Peter Cook as Clive
 Dudley Moore as Derek
 Judy Huxtable as Judy Cook
 Nicola Austine as Lady who came in and took her clothes off
 Richard Branson as Man with a beard

Release
The film was intended for a theatrical release, but in October 1980, the British Board of Film Classification rejected it outright on the grounds of its sustained and excessive use of very strong language (the uses of "fuck" and "cunt"), and blasphemy.

Cook instead chose to release the film straight to video, a format that was at the time unregulated, but this plan also ran into trouble when several hundred copies were impounded by "God's copper" James Anderton of the Greater Manchester Police, sending the small company behind the release spiraling into bankruptcy. Derek and Clive Get the Horn was finally granted an uncut 18 certificate in 1993 and was released as a sell-through video by PolyGram.

References

External links
 
 

1979 films
1979 comedy films
1979 documentary films
British comedy films
British documentary films
1970s English-language films
Films directed by Russell Mulcahy
Direct-to-video documentary films
Documentary films about comedy and comedians
Films shot in London
Universal Pictures films
1979 directorial debut films
1970s British films